Fredrick Daniel Jones (born September 2, 1965) is a former American football linebacker who played one season with the Kansas City Chiefs of the National Football League. He played college football at Florida State University and attended South Miami High School in Miami, Florida.

References

External links
Just Sports Stats

Players of American football from Miami
American football linebackers
South Miami Senior High School alumni
Florida State Seminoles football players
Kansas City Chiefs players
Living people
1965 births